Kermia pumila is a species of sea snail, a marine gastropod mollusc in the family Raphitomidae.

It was assigned to Kermia by Zhang, 1995.

Description
The length of the shell varies between 3.5 mm and 6 mm.

The shell is pinkish white, with an orange-brown band near the sutures, and a broader one below the middle of the body whorl.

Distribution
This marine species has a wide distribution. It occurs off Polynesia; Hawaii; Fiji; Okinawa; Mascarenes, Seychelles, North KwaZulu-Natal, South Africa

References

 Deshayes, G. P., 1863 Catalogue des mollusques de l‛Ile de la Réunion (Bourbon). In Maillard, L. (Ed.) Notes sur l'Ile de la Réunion (Bourbon), p. 144 p, 14 pls
 Severns, M. (2011). Shells of the Hawaiian Islands - The Sea Shells.
 Liu J.Y. [Ruiyu] (ed.). (2008). Checklist of marine biota of China seas. China Science Press. 1267 pp. Conchbooks, Hackenheim. 564 pp.

External links

 Pease W.H. (1868 ["1867"]). Descriptions of marine Gasteropodæ, inhabiting Polynesia. American Journal of Conchology. 3(3): 211-222
 Moretzsohn, Fabio, and E. Alison Kay. "HAWAIIAN MARINE MOLLUSCS." (1995)
 Tröndlé, J. E. A. N., and Michel Boutet. "Inventory of marine molluscs of French Polynesia." Atoll Research Bulletin (2009)
 Kilburn, R. N. (2009). Genus Kermia (Mollusca: Gastropoda: Conoidea: Conidae: Raphitominae) in South African Waters, with Observations on the Identities of Related Extralimital Species. African Invertebrates. 50(2): 217-236
  Li B.-Q. [Baoquan] & Li X.-Z. [Xinzheng] (2014) Report on the Raphitomidae Bellardi, 1875 (Mollusca: Gastropoda: Conoidea) from the China Seas. Journal of Natural History 48(17-18): 999-1025
 * 
 Gastropods.com: Kermia pumila

pumila
Gastropods described in 1845